Dravidogecko is a  genus of Indian gecko.  It includes the following species:

Anamalay dravidogecko, Dravidogecko anamallensis (Günther, 1875)
Adams’s dravidogecko, Dravidogecko douglasadamsi (Chaitanya, Giri, Deepak, Datta-Roy, Murthy, & Karanth, 2019)
Janaki’s dravidogecko, Dravidogecko janakiae (Chaitanya, Giri, Deepak, Datta-Roy, Murthy, & Karanth, 2019)
Meghamalai dravidogecko, Dravidogecko meghamalaiensis (Chaitanya, Giri, Deepak, Datta-Roy, Murthy, & Karanth, 2019)
Wayanad dravidogecko, Dravidogecko septentrionalis (Chaitanya, Giri, Deepak, Datta-Roy, Murthy, & Karanth, 2019)
Smith’s dravidogecko, Dravidogecko smithi (Chaitanya, Giri, Deepak, Datta-Roy, Murthy, & Karanth, 2019)
Kodaikanal dravidogecko, Dravidogecko tholpalli (Chaitanya, Giri, Deepak, Datta-Roy, Murthy, & Karanth, 2019)

References

 
Lizard genera